Frank Waldman (March 15, 1919 – September 5, 1990) was an American screenwriter who frequently worked with Blake Edwards and his brother Tom Waldman.

Waldman was born in Chicago, Illinois. He wrote for the documentary series This Is Tom Jones, as well as episodes for  Peter Gunn, I Dream of Jeannie, McHale's Navy, Bewitched, Gilligan's Island, The Greatest Show on Earth, and The Judy Garland Show.

Selected filmography

Bathing Beauty (1944 ) 
High Time (1960)
Love Is a Ball (1963)
The Party (1968)
Inspector Clouseau (1968)
The Return of the Pink Panther (1975)
The Pink Panther Strikes Again (1976)
Revenge of the Pink Panther (1978)
Trail of the Pink Panther (1982)

References

External links

1919 births
1990 deaths
Writers from Chicago
American male screenwriters
Screenwriters from Illinois
20th-century American male writers
20th-century American screenwriters